Commercial broadcasting (also called private broadcasting) is the broadcasting of television programs and radio programming by privately owned corporate media, as opposed to state sponsorship. It was the United States' first model of radio (and later television) during the 1920s, in contrast with the public television model in Europe during the 1930s, 1940s and 1950s, which prevailed worldwide, except in the United States and Brazil, until the 1980s.

Features

Advertising 
Commercial broadcasting is primarily based on the practice of airing radio advertisements and television advertisements for profit. This is in contrast to public broadcasting, which receives government subsidies and usually does not have paid advertising interrupting the show. During pledge drives, some public broadcasters will interrupt shows to ask for donations.

In the United States, non-commercial educational (NCE) television and radio exists in the form of community radio; however, premium cable services such as HBO and Showtime generally operate solely on subscriber fees and do not sell advertising. This is also the case for the portions of the two major satellite radio systems that are produced in-house (mainly music programming).

Radio broadcasting originally began without paid commercials. As time went on, however, advertisements seemed less objectionable to both the public and government regulators and became more common.  While commercial broadcasting was unexpected in radio, in television it was planned due to commercial radio's success. Television began with commercial sponsorship and later transformed to paid commercial time. When problems arose over patents and corporate marketing strategies, regulatory decisions were made by the Federal Communications Commission (FCC) to control commercial broadcasting.

Paid programming 
Commercial broadcasting overlaps with paid services such as cable television, radio and satellite television. Such services are generally partially or wholly paid for by local subscribers and is known as leased access. Other programming (particularly on cable television) is produced by companies operating in much the same manner as advertising-funded commercial broadcasters, and they (and often the local cable provider) sell commercial time in a similar manner.

The FCC's interest in program control began with the chain-broadcasting investigation of the late 1930s, culminating in the "Blue Book" of 1946, Public Service Responsibility For Broadcast Licensees. The Blue Book differentiated between mass-appeal sponsored programs and unsponsored "sustaining" programs offered by the radio networks. This sustained programming, according to the Blue Book, had five features serving the public interest:
Sustaining programs balanced the broadcast schedule, supplementing the soap operas and popular-music programs receiving the highest ratings and most commercial sponsors
They allowed for the broadcast of programs which, by their controversial or sensitive nature, were unsuitable for sponsorship
They supplied cultural programming for smaller audiences
They provided limited broadcast access for non-profit and civic organizations
They made possible artistic and dramatic experimentation, shielded from the pressures of short-run rating and commercial considerations of a sponsor.

Commercial time has increased 31 seconds per hour for all prime time television shows. For example, ABC has increased from 9 minutes and 26 seconds to 11 minutes and 26 seconds.

Ratings 
Programming on commercial stations is more ratings-driven—particularly during periods such as sweeps in the US and some Latin American countries.

Other factors 
Commercial broadcasting (especially free-to-air) is sometimes controversial. One reason is a perceived lack of quality and risk in the programming (to which more conservative elements respond that it is too risqué much of the time), an excessively high ratio of advertising to program time (especially on children's television), and a perceived failure to serve the local interest due to media consolidation. Commercial radio (in particular) is criticized for a perceived homogeneity in programming, covert politically motivated censorship of content, and a desire to cut costs at the expense of a station's identifiable personality. Politics is a major force in media criticism, with an ongoing debate (especially in the United States) as to what moral standards – if any – are to be applied to the airwaves.

Global commercial broadcasting

Americas 
Commercial broadcasting is the dominant type of broadcasting in the United States and most of Latin America. "The US commercial system resulted from a carefully crafted cooperation endeavor by national corporations and federal regulators."

The best-known commercial broadcasters in the United States today are the ABC, CBS, Fox, and NBC television networks, based in the United States. Major cable television in the United States operators include Comcast, Charter Communications and Cox Communications. Direct-broadcast satellite (DBS) services include DirecTV and Dish Network.

In an hour of broadcast time on a commercial broadcasting station, 10 to 20 minutes are typically devoted to advertising. Advertisers pay a certain amount of money to air their commercials, usually based upon program ratings or the audience measurement of a station or network.  This makes commercial broadcasters more accountable to advertisers than public broadcasting, a disadvantage of commercial radio and television.

Europe 
In Europe, commercial broadcasting coexists with public broadcasting (where programming is largely funded by broadcast receiver licences, public donations or government grants).

In the UK, Sky UK is available and WorldSpace Satellite Radio was available.

Asia 
The best-known commercial services in Asia are one of the South Korean radio and television network SBS along with one of the Hong Kong television network TVB.

List of major commercial broadcasters
Contemporary hit radio in bold.

Americas

Argentina
América
Paramount Networks Americas
Telefe
El Nueve
El Trece
Net TV
Bravo TV

Bolivia
ATB
Canal 11 
Bolivisión 
Red UNO

Brazil
Band
Globo
RecordTV
RedeTV!
SBT
CNT

Canada
English language
CTV
Citytv
Global Television Network

French language
TVA
Noovo

Chile
UCV Televisión
Canal 13
Paramount Networks Americas
Chilevisión
Mega
La Red
Telecanal

Colombia
RCN Televisión
Caracol Televisión
Channel 1
Canal A

Costa Rica
Teletica
Repretel

Ecuador
Ecuavisa
Gamavisión
Teleamazonas
TC Televisión
Canal Uno

El Salvador
Telecorporación Salvadoreña
Canal 12
Megavisión

Guatemala
Canal 3

Honduras
Televicentro

Mexico
Televisa
TV Azteca
Imagen Televisión
Grupo Multimedios
MVS Comunicaciones
Quiero TV

Panama
Telemetro
TVN

Paraguay
Paravisión
SNT
Trece
Unicanal

Peru
América Televisión
Global Televisión 
ATV
Latina Televisión
Panamericana Televisión
La Tele

United States
English language
ABC
CBS
Fox
NBC
The CW
MyNetworkTV

Spanish language
Azteca América
Estrella TV
Telemundo
Univision
UniMás

Uruguay
Canal 4
Canal 10
Teledoce

Venezuela
Venevisión
Televen
Globovisión
Meridiano Televisión
Vale TV

Asia

Hong Kong
Fantastic Television Limited (奇妙電視|FTV) — Hong Kong, China
76HD - Hong Kong International Business Channel (香港國際財經台) - Hong Kong/Hong Kong English
77HD - HOY TV - Hong Kong/Hong Kong Cantonese
78HD - HOY Infotainment (HOY資訊台) - Hong Kong/Hong Kong Cantonese
HK Television Entertainment Ltd (香港電視娛樂有限公司|HKTVE) — Hong Kong, China
96HD - ViuTVsix - Hong Kong/Hong Kong English
97HD - ViuTV - Hong Kong/Hong Kong Cantonese
Television Broadcasts Limited (電視廣播有限公司 "無綫電視"|TVB) — Hong Kong, China
81HD - TVB Jade (無線電視翡翠台) - Hong Kong/Hong Kong Cantonese
82HD - TVB J2 - Hong Kong/Contemporary Teenager Youth Teen Channel 
83HD - TVB News Channel (無線新聞台) - Hong Kong/24-hour clock News Channel
84HD - TVB Pearl (無線電視明珠台) - Hong Kong/Hong Kong English
85HD - TVB Finance, Sports & Information Channel (無綫財經·體育·資訊台) - Hong Kong/24-hour clock Finance, Sport and Information Channel
Commercial Radio Hong Kong (香港商業電台)
Supercharged 881 (雷霆881) (88.1 - 89.5 FM)
Ultimate 903 (叱咤903) (90.3 - 92.1 FM)
AM864 (豁達864) (864 AM)
Metro Broadcast Corporation (新城電台)
Metro Info (新城知訊台) (99.7 - 102.1 FM)
Metro Finance (新城財經台) (102.4 - 106.3 FM)
Metro Plus (新城采訊台) (1044 AM)

India
Paramount Networks EMEAA 
Colors TV
Zee Entertainment Enterprises
Zee TV
The Walt Disney Company India
Star Plus
Culver Max Entertainment
Sony Entertainment Television

Indonesia
PT Media Nusantara Citra Tbk (MNC Media)
PT Rajawali Citra Televisi Indonesia (RCTI)
PT MNC Televisi Indonesia (MNCTV)
PT Global Informasi Bermutu (GTV)
PT MNC Televisi Network (iNews)
PT MNC Networks (MNC Radio Networks)
PT Radio Trijaya Shakti (MNC Trijaya FM)
PT Radio Suara Monalisa (RDI)
PT Radio Arief Rahman Hakim (Global Radio)
PT Radio Sabda Sosok Sohor (V Radio)
PT Elang Mahkota Teknologi Tbk (Emtek)
PT Omni Intivision (Moji)
PT Surya Citra Media Tbk (SCM)
PT Surya Citra Televisi (SCTV)
PT Indosiar Visual Mandiri (Indosiar)
Mentari TV
PT Media Group
PT Media Televisi Indonesia (MetroTV)
PT Mitra Media Digital (Magna Channel)
PT Mitra Siaran Bisnis (BN Channel)
Metro Globe Network
PT Radio Agustina Junior (MG Radio Network)
PT Trans Media Corpora (Trans Media)
PT Televisi Transformasi Indonesia (Trans TV)
PT Duta Visual Nusantara Tivi Tujuh (Trans7)
PT Trans News Corpora (CNN Indonesia) (license from Warner Bros. Discovery)
PT Trans Berita Bisnis (CNBC Indonesia) (license from NBCUniversal)
PT Visi Media Asia Tbk (VIVA)
PT Intermedia Capital Tbk (IMDA)
PT Cakrawala Andalas Televisi (ANTV)
PT Lativi Media Karya (tvOne)
PT Viva Televisi Olahraga Indonesia (VTV)
PT Indika Inti Mandiri (Indika Group)
PT Net Visi Media Tbk (NET.)
PT Net Mediatama Televisi (NET.)
PT Net Media Berita
PT Net Media Digital (Netverse)
PT Kreatif Inti Korpora (Creative Inc.)
PT Indika Multimedia
PT Radio Indika Millenia (Indika FM)
PT KG Media
PT Cipta Megaswara Televisi (Kompas TV)
PT Magentic Network Indonesia (KG Radio Network)
PT Radio Sonora (Sonora FM)
PT Radio Safari Bina Budaya (Motion Radio)
PT Radio Smart Media Utama (Smart FM)
PT Rajawali Corpora
PT Metropolitan Televisindo (RTV)
PT MRA Media
PT Media Network Wahana (MNI)
PT Radio Antarnusa Djaja (Hard Rock FM)
PT Radio Tiara Victoria (Trax FM)
PT Radio Mustika Abadi (I-Radio)
PT Radio Muara Abdinusa (Cosmopolitan FM)
PT Pesona Gita Anindita (Brava Radio)
PT Mahaka Media 
Mahaka Radio Integra
PT Radio Attahiriyah (Gen FM)
PT Radio Suara Irama Indah (Jak FM)
PT Radio Merpati Darmawangsa (Hot FM)
PT Radio Ramako Jaya Raya (Most FM)
PT Radio Mustang Utama (Mustang FM)
PT Radio Kirana Insan Suara (Kis FM)
Noice
Rayya Channel
PT Masima Radio Network
PT Radio Prambors (Prambors)
PT Radio Kayu Manis (FeMale Radio)
PT Radio Delta Insani (Delta FM)
PT Radio Terik Matahari Bahana Pembangunan (Bahana FM)
PT Elshinta Media Group
PT Radio Elshinta (Elshinta Radio Network)
Fit Radio
Kiss Network
PT Radio Kidung Indah Selaras Suara (Kiss FM Medan)

Japan (key stations)
Tokyo TV Asahi (東京テレビ朝日) (EX)
Tokyo Fuji TV (東京フジテレビ) (CX)
Tokyo InterFM (東京InterFM) (DW)
Tokyo J-Wave (東京J-WAVE) (AV)
Tokyo Nippon Broadcasting System (東京ニッポン放送) (LF)
Tokyo Nippon Cultural Broadcasting (東京文化放送) (QR)
Tokyo Nippon Television Network (東京日本テレビ放送網) (AX)
Tokyo Broadcasting System Radio (東京TBSラジオ) (KR)
Tokyo Broadcasting System Television (東京TBSテレビ) (RX)
Tokyo FM (東京エフエム) (AU)
TV Tokyo (テレビ東京) (TX)

Malaysia
Commercial Radio Malaysia
Hitz
Hitz Sabah (Sabah only)
Hitz Sarawak (Sarawak only)
Hitz Urban
Hitz Dance
Hitz Tik-Tok
Hitz Throwback
Hitz Chillest
Hitz Workout
Hitz Top 40
Hitz Local
Hitz K-Pop
Lite
Lite Your 70 Favourite
Lite 80 Sing Along
Lite Acoustic
Mix
Mix Dance
Mix 90
Mix Tape
Mix Lovesongs
Era
Era Sabah (Sabah only)
Era Sarawak (Sarawak only)
Era Flow
Era Cintan
Era K-Hit
Era Nusantera
Era Throwbaek
Era Erathon
Era Nurock
Era Indie
Synchrosound Studio Sdn Bhd (Hot FM)
Sinar
Sinar Rock
Sinar Jiwang
Sinar Irama 70
Sinar Irama 80
Sinar Iramalaysia
Sinar Popyehyeh
Sinar Sinema
Sinar i-Musik
Suria
Melody
Melody Chinese Classics 70s
Melody Chinese Classics 80s
Melody Chinese Classics Love
Melody Chinese Classics 90s
Melody Chinese Classics OST
My
My Sabah (Sabah only)
My Sarawak (Sarawak only)
My Chinese Drop The Beat
My Chinese Pop
My Chinese Rock
My Chinese Kara
My Chinese Love Uu
My Chinese Positive
8FM Radio Sdn Bhd (8FM)
BFM 89.9
Max-Airplay Sdn Bhd (Fly FM)
KK12FM
Best FM
Gegar
Gegar Hoh Btabuh
Gegar Tradisi
Gegar Hindi
Gegar Maghi Gelek
Buletin FM Radio Sdn Bhd (Buletin FM)
Molek FM Radio Sdn Bhd (Molek FM)
Manis FM
Zayan
Zayan Almusika
Zayan Nasyeed
Zayan Surah
Zayan Adam
Zayan Hawa
988 FM
City Plus FM
goXuan
goXuan Chinese Trending
goXuan K-Pop
goXuan Chinese OST
goXuan Chinese Tik-Tok
TEA FM
Raaga
Raaga Isaimazhai
Raaga Bolly 4U
Raaga 80s Evergreen
Raaga 90S Hits
Raaga Nambe Area
Bapakku.FM
RADIOROSAK
Cats FM
IM4U FM 107.9
Kupi-Kupi FM
VOKFM
Media Prima
Media Prima Television Networks
Sistem Televisyen Malaysia Berhad (TV3)
Natseven TV Sdn Bhd (NTV7)
Metropolitan TV Sdn Bhd (8TV)
Ch-9 Media Sdn Bhd (TV9)
Wow Shop
Drama Sangat
Media Prima Audio
Synchrosound Studio Sdn Bhd (Hot FM)
Max-Airplay Sdn Bhd (Fly FM)
8FM Radio Sdn Bhd (8FM)
Buletin FM Radio Sdn Bhd (Buletin FM)
Molek FM Radio Sdn Bhd (Molek FM)
Audio+
SuperDeals
Primeworks Studios
Primeworks Distribution
Monkey Bone
8unit
New Straits Times Press
New Straits Times
Berita Harian
Harian Metro
Hijab & Heels
FullAMark
Mind Campus  
Big Tree
Kurnia Outdoor
UPD
The Right Channel
Gotcha
Big Tree Seni Jaya
Astro Malaysia Holdings
Astro Malaysia (Measat Broadcast Network Systems Sdn Bhd)
Astro B.yond
Astro IPTV
Astro NJOI
Fetch TV
Astro Channels
Astro AEC
Astro AOD
Astro Arena
Astro Arena 2
Astro Aura
Astro Awani
Astro Best (VOD)
Astro Box Office
Astro Box Office BollyOne HD
Astro Box Office Thangathirai
Astro Ceria
Astro Citra
Astro Cricket
Astro First (VOD)
Astro Hua Hee Dai
Astro Oasis
Astro Prima
Astro Quan Jia HD
Astro Rania
Astro Ria
Astro SuperSport
Astro SuperSport 2
Astro SuperSport 3
Astro SuperSport 4
Astro SuperSport 5
Astro Shuang Xing
Astro Tutor TV
Astro Tutor TV SK
Astro Tutor TV SMK
Astro UHD
Astro Vaanavil
Astro Vellithirai
Astro Vinmeen HD
Astro Wah Lai Toi On Demand
Astro Warna
Astro Xiao Tai Yang
BOO
eGG Network
Go Shop
GO Shop Chinese
GO Shop Gaaya
GO Shop Ruuma
PRIMEtime
Showcase Movies
TA-DAA!
Astro Shaw
Astro Radio
Era
Era Sabah (Sabah only)
Era Sarawak (Sarawak only)
Era Flow
Era Cintan
Era K-Hit
Era Nusantera
Era Throwbaek
Era Erathon
Era Nurock
Era Indie
Gegar
Gegar Hoh Btabuh
Gegar Tradisi
Gegar Hindi
Gegar Maghi Gelek
goXuan
goXuan Chinese Trending
goXuan K-Pop
goXuan Chinese OST
goXuan Chinese Tik-Tok
Hitz
Hitz Sabah (Sabah only)
Hitz Sarawak (Sarawak only)
Hitz Urban
Hitz Dance
Hitz Tik-Tok
Hitz Throwback
Hitz Chillest
Hitz Workout
Hitz Top 40
Hitz Local
Hitz K-Pop
Lite
Lite Your 70 Favourite
Lite 80 Sing Along
Lite Acoustic
Melody
Melody Chinese Classics 70s
Melody Chinese Classics 80s
Melody Chinese Classics Love
Melody Chinese Classics 90s
Melody Chinese Classics OST
Mix
Mix Dance
Mix 90
Mix Tape
Mix Lovesongs
My
My Sabah (Sabah only)
My Sarawak (Sarawak only)
My Chinese Drop The Beat
My Chinese Pop
My Chinese Rock
My Chinese Kara
My Chinese Love Uu
My Chinese Positive
Raaga
Raaga Isaimazhai
Raaga Bolly 4U
Raaga 80s Evergreen
Raaga 90S Hits
Raaga Nambe Area
Sinar
Sinar Rock
Sinar Jiwang
Sinar Irama 70
Sinar Irama 80
Sinar Iramalaysia
Sinar Popyehyeh
Sinar Sinema
Sinar i-Musik
Zayan
Zayan Almusika
Zayan Nasyeed
Zayan Surah
Zayan Adam
Zayan Hawa
Syok
Syok Bayu
Syok Gold
Syok India Beat
Syok Jazz
Syok Kenyalang
Syok Opus
Syok Osai
Syok Classic Rock
Tayangan Unggul
Go Shop
Star Media Group Berhad
The Star
Star Media Radio Group
Suria
988 FM
Awesome Media Network Berhad
Awesome TV

Philippines (major commercial station)
A2Z
GMA
TV5

Singapore
Astro Malaysia Holdings
Astro Sensasi
SPH Media Trust
96.3 Hao FM
UFM100.3
Money FM 89.3
Kiss 92
One FM 91.3
So Drama! Entertainment
883Jia
Power 98

South Korea
Seoul Broadcasting System (SBS)
SBS TV
SBS Plus
SBS Sports
SBS Biz
SBS F!L
SBS funE
SBS Golf
SBS M
KiZmom
SBS Love FM
SBS Power FM
SBS V-Radio 
Korea New Network (KNN)
Taegu Broadcasting Corporation (TBC)
Kwangju Broadcasting Corporation (KBC)
Taejon Broadcasting Corporation (TJB)
Ulsan Broadcasting Corporation (UBC)
Jeonju Television (JTV)
Cheongju Broadcasting (CJB)
Gangwon No.1 Broadcasting (G1)
Jeju Free International City Broadcasting System (JIBS)
Joongang Tongyang Broadcasting Company (JTBC)
JTBC
JTBC2
JTBC Golf&Sports
JTBC4
JTBC Golf
CJ E&M
Mnet
tvN
tvN Drama
tvN Show
tvN Story
tvN Sports
OCN
OCN Movies
OCN Thrills
Chunghwa TV
Tooniverse
OBS Gyeongin TV

Taiwan
TVBS Media Inc.
TVBS Main Channel
TVBS Entertainment Channel
TVBS-NEWS
Taiwan Television (臺灣電視公司 "台視"|TTV)
TTV Main Channel
TTV Finance
TTV Variety
TTV News Channel
China Television (中國電視公司 "中視"|CTV)
CTV Main Channel
CTV News Channel
CTV Classic
CTV Bravo
Chinese Television System (中華電視公司 "華視"|CTS)
CTS Main Channel
CTS News and Info
Formosa Television (民間全民電視公司 "民視"|FTV)
FTV Main Channel
FTV Taiwan
FTV News
FTV One

Thailand
 Bangkok Amarin Television Co Ltd
 Bangkok Amarin TV (34)
 Bangkok Media Broadcasting Co Ltd
 Bangkok PPTV HD (36)
 Bangkok BEC Multimedia Co Ltd
 Bangkok Channel 3 HD (33)
 Bangkok GMM Grammy
 Bangkok GMM Channel Co Ltd (under GMM Grammy)
 Bangkok GMM 25 (25)
 Bangkok One 31 Co Ltd (under Bangkok The One Enterprise)
 Bangkok ONE 31 (31)
 Bangkok Atime Media
 Bangkok Green Wave 106.5 FM
 Bangkok EFM 94
 Bangkok MONO Next
 Bangkok MONO29 (29)
 Bangkok RS Public Company Limited (RS Vision Company Limited)
 Bangkok Channel 8 (27)
 Bangkok Tero Entertainment
 Bangkok Tero Radio
 Bangkok Hitz 955 (95.5 MHz)
 Bangkok Eazy FM 105.5 (105.5 MHz)
 Bangkok Thairath (under Bangkok Triple V Broadcast Co Ltd)
 Bangkok Thairath TV (32)
 TrueVisions Bangkok
 True Korean More
 True Select
 Bangkok True4U (24)
 True Chinese More
 True Asian More
 True Film HD1
 True Film HD2
 True Film Asia 
 True Inside
 True Plook Panya
 True Reality
 True Series
 True Spark Play
 True Spark Jump
 True Sport 1 
 True Sport 2 
 True Sport 3 
 True Tennis HD 
 True Sport 5 
 True Sport 6
 True Sport 7
 True Sport HD1
 True Sport HD2
 True Sport HD3
 True Sport HD4
 True Thai Film
 True X-Zyte 
 True Shopping 
 True Explore Wild
 True Explore Life
 True Explore Sci
 True Movie Hits
 True Music
 TNN 16
 TNN 2
 Bangkok Workpoint Entertainment
 Bangkok Workpoint TV (23)

Vietnam
Vietnam Television Corporation
VTC1
VTC2
VTC3
VTC4
VTC5
VTC6
VTC7
VTC8
VTC9
VTC10
VTC12
VTC13
VTC14
VTC16

Europe

Norway
TV 2 Group
 TV 2
 TV 2 Zebra
 TV 2 Nyheter
 TV 2 Sport
 TV 2 Sport Premium
 TV 2 Livsstil
Viaplay Group
 TV3 Norway
 TV3+ Norway
 TV6 Norway
Warner Bros. Discovery Norway
 TVNorge
 FEM
 MAX
 VOX

Denmark
Viaplay Group
TV3 Denmark
TV3+
TV3 Puls
TV3 Max
TV3 Sport
See
Warner Bros. Discovery Denmark
Kanal 4
Kanal 5
6'eren
Canal 9

Sweden
TV4 AB
TV4
Sjuan
TV12
TV4 Fakta
TV4 Film
TV4 Guld
Viaplay Group
TV3
TV6
TV8
TV10
Warner Bros. Discovery Sweden
Kanal 5
Kanal 9
Kanal 11

Finland
MTV Oy
MTV3
MTV Sub
MTV Ava
C More Total
C More Max
C More Juniori
C More Sport 1
C More Sport 2
Nelonen Media
Nelonen
Jim
Liv
Hero
Warner Bros. Discovery Finland
TV5
Kutonen
Frii
TLC

Republic of Ireland
Virgin Media Television
Virgin Media One (SD, HD & +1)
Virgin Media Two (SD & HD)
Virgin Media Three (SD & HD)
Virgin Media Four (SD & HD)
Virgin Media More (SD & HD)
Bauer Media Audio Ireland
Newstalk
Today FM

United Kingdom
Paramount Networks UK & Australia
Channel 5
5Action
5Select
5Star
5USA
ITV plc
ITV1
STV – Northern and Central Scotland
UTV – Northern Ireland
ITV2
ITV3
ITV4
ITVBe
CITV
Sky UK
Blaze
Challenge
Crime & Investigation
Pick
Sky Arts
Sky Atlantic
Sky Cinema
Sky Comedy
Sky Crime
Sky Documentaries
Sky History
Sky History 2
Sky Kids
Sky Max
Sky Nature
Sky News
Sky Replay
Sky Sci-Fi
Sky Showcase
Sky Sports
Sky Sports Box Office
Sky Sports F1
Sky Sports News
Sky Sports Racing
Sky Witness
Global Media & Entertainment
Capital
Capital UK
Capital Dance
Capital Xtra
Capital Xtra Reloaded
Capital Cymru
Capital Liverpool
Capital London
Capital Manchester and Lancashire
Capital Mid-Counties
Capital Midlands
Capital North East
Capital North West and Wales
Capital Scotland
Capital South
Capital South Wales
Capital Yorkshire
Classic FM
Gold
Heart
Heart Dance
Heart UK
Heart 70s
Heart 80s
Heart 90s
Heart East
Heart Hertfordshire
Heart London
Heart North East
Heart North Wales
Heart North West
Heart Scotland
Heart South
Heart South Wales
Heart West
Heart West Midlands
Heart Yorkshire
LBC
LBC News
Radio X
Smooth Radio
Smooth Chill
Smooth Country
Smooth Extra
Smooth East Midlands
Smooth Lake District
Smooth London
Smooth North East
Smooth North West
Smooth Scotland
Smooth Wales
Smooth West Midlands
Bauer Media Audio UK
Absolute Radio Network
Absolute Radio
Absolute Radio 60s
Absolute Radio 70s
Absolute Radio 80s
Absolute Radio 90s
Absolute Radio 00s
Absolute Radio 10s
Absolute Radio 20s
Absolute Radio Classic Rock
Absolute Radio Country
Greatest Hits Radio
Hits Radio
Hits Radio UK
Hits Radio Pride
Hits Radio London
Hits Radio Manchester
Hits Radio South Coast
Jazz FM
Kerrang! Radio
Kerrang! Radio Unleashed
Klassic Kerrang! Radio
Kiss Network
Kiss
Kisstory
Kiss Fresh
Kiss Bliss
Kiss Dance
Kiss Garage
Magic
Magic Chilled
Magic Mellow
Magic Soul
Magic Workout
Magic at the Musicals
Magic 100% Christmas
Planet Rock
Scala Radio
Wireless Group
Talksport
Talksport 2
Talkradio
Times Radio
Virgin Radio UK
Virgin Radio Anthems
Virgin Radio Chilled
Virgin Radio Groove

France
TF1 Group
TF1
TMC
TFX
TF1 Séries Films
LCI
M6 Group (48.6%)
M6
W9
6ter
Gulli
Paris Première
Téva
M6 Music
TiJi
Canal J
Fun Radio
RTL
RTL 2
RTL Group
Fun Radio
RTL
RTL 2
Canal+ Group
Canal+
Canal+ Cinéma
Canal+ Sport
Canal+ Kids
Canal+ Docs
Canal+ Grand Écran
Canal+ Séries
Canal+ Sport 360°
Canal+ Foot
C8
CNews
CStar
CStar Hits France
Altice Média
BFM TV
BFM Business
RMC Story
RMC Découverte
NRJ Group
NRJ 12
NRJ Hits
Chérie 25

Italy
Mediaset
Rete 4
Canale 5
Italia 1
20
Iris
27 Twentyseven
La5
Cine34
Focus
Top Crime
Boing
Cartoonito
Italia 2
TgCom24
Mediaset Extra
Warner Bros. Discovery Italia
Nove
DMAX
Food Network
Frisbee
Giallo
HGTV
K2
Motor Trend
Real Time
Warner TV
Sky Italia
Cielo
Sky Arte
Sky Atlantic
Sky Cinema
Sky Documentaries
Sky Investigation
Sky Nature
Sky Serie
Sky Sport
Sky TG24
Sky Uno
TV8
Cairo Communication
La7
La7d
Paramount Global Italia
Super!
VH1

Germany
RTL Deutschland
RTL Television
VOX
RTL II
RTLup
Nitro
Super RTL
Toggo Plus
n-tv
VOXup
RTL Crime
RTL Living
RTL Passion
Geo Television
ProSiebenSat.1 Media
Sat.1
ProSieben
kabel eins
sixx
Sat.1 Gold
ProSieben Maxx
kabel eins Doku
Sat.1 Emotions
ProSieben Fun
kabel eins classics
Sky Deutschland
Sky Atlantic
Sky Cinema
Sky Comedy
Sky Crime
Sky Documentaries
Sky Krimi
Sky Nature
Sky One
Sky Replay
Sky Showcase
Sky Sport

Netherlands
RTL Nederland
RTL 4
RTL 5
RTL 7
RTL 8
RTL Z
RTL Crime
RTL Lounge
RTL Telekids
Talpa Network
Talpa TV
Net5
SBS6 
Veronica
SBS9
TV 538
Talpa Radio
Radio 538
Radio 10
Sky Radio
Radio Veronica

Spain
Atresmedia
Antena 3
La Sexta
Neox
Nova
Mega
Atreseries
Mediaset España
Telecinco
Cuatro
FDF
Divinity
Energy
Boing
Be Mad TV HD

Portugal
SIC
SIC
SIC Notícias
SIC Mulher
SIC Radical
SIC K
SIC Caras
SIC Internacional
TVI
TVI
TVI Ficção
TVI Reality
CNN Portugal
TVI África
TVI Internacional

Poland
Telewizja Polsat
Polsat
Polsat 1
Polsat 2
Super Polsat
TV4
TV6
Polsat Comedy Central Extra
Polsat X
Polsat Rodzina
Polsat News
Polsat News 2
Wydarzenia 24
Polsat Sport
Polsat Sport Premium
Polsat Sport Premium PPV
Polsat Sport Extra
Polsat Sport News
Polsat Sport Fight
Polsat Games
Eleven Sports
Polsat Film
Polsat Film 2
Polsat Café
Polsat Play
Nowa TV
Polsat Reality
Polsat JimJam
Polsat Doku
Fokus TV
Polsat Viasat Nature
Polsat Viasat History
Polsat Viasat Explore
Crime+Investigation Polsat
Polsat Music
Disco Polo Music
Eska TV 
Eska TV Extra
Eska Rock TV
Polo TV
Vox Music TV
TV Okazje
TVN Warner Bros. Discovery
TVN
TVN 7
TVN24
TVN24 BiS
TVN Fabuła
TVN Meteo
TVN Style
TVN Turbo
iTVN
iTVN Extra
Metro
TTV
Animal Planet
Cartoon Network
Cartoonito
Cinemax
Cinemax 2
Discovery Channel
Discovery Science
Discovery Historia
Discovery Life
DTX
Eurosport
Eurosport 1
Eurosport 2
Food Network
HBO
HBO 2
HBO 3
HGTV
Investigation Discovery
TLC
Travel Channel
WarnerTV

Oceania

Australia
Seven West Media
Seven Network
ATN Sydney
HSV Melbourne
BTQ Brisbane
SAS Adelaide
TVW Perth
STQ Regional Queensland
CBN Southern NSW & ACT
7two
7mate
7flix
7Bravo
7plus
Racing.com
Nine Entertainment
Nine Network
TCN Sydney
GTV Melbourne
QTQ Brisbane
NWS Adelaide
STW Perth
9Gem
9Go!
9Life
9Rush
9Now
Nine Radio
2GB 873 Sydney
3AW 693 Melbourne
4BC 882 Brisbane
6PR 882 Perth 
2UE 954 Sydney
4BH 1116 Brisbane
Magic 1278 Melbourne
Paramount Networks UK & Australia
Network 10
TEN Sydney
ATV Melbourne
TVQ Brisbane
ADS Adelaide
NEW Perth
10 Peach
10 Bold
10 Shake
10 Play
Paramount+
Southern Cross Austereo
Southern Cross Seven
Southern Cross 10
CTC Southern NSW & ACT
Hit Network
SAFM Adelaide
Hit91.9 Bendigo
Hit104.9 The Border
B105 FM Brisbane
90.9 Sea FM Gold Coast
Hit 100.9 Hobart
SAFM 96.1 Limestone Coast
Fox FM Melbourne
Hit106.9 Newcastle
Mix 94.5 Perth
Hit93.1 Riverina
South Queensland
2Day FM Sydney
Hit103.1 Townsville
Hit Western Australia
Buddha Hits
RnB Fridays
Dance Hits
Easy 80s Hits
Kids Hits
Oldskool 90s Hits
Triple M
Triple M Adelaide
Triple M Bendigo
Triple M The Border
Triple M Brisbane
Triple M Central Coast
Triple M Central Queensland
Triple M Central West
Triple M Darling Downs
Triple M Dubbo
Triple M Gippsland
Triple M Gold Coast
Triple M Goulburn Valley
Triple M Hobart
Triple M Mackay & The Whitsundays
Triple M Melbourne
Triple M Newcastle
Triple M Perth
Triple M Riverina
Triple M Riverina MIA
Triple M Southwest
Triple M Sunraysia
Triple M Sydney
Triple M Townsville
Triple M 90s
Triple M Classic Rock
Triple M Country
Triple M Hard n Heavy
Triple M Soft Rock
Australian Radio Network
KIIS Network
KIIS 101.1 Melbourne
KIIS 106.5 Sydney
96FM Perth
97.3 FM Brisbane
Mix 102.3 Adelaide
96FM 80s
96FM 90s
KIIS 80s
KIIS 90s
Mix 80s
Mix 90s
Pure Gold Network
4KQ Brisbane
Cruise 1323 Adelaide
Gold 104.3 Melbourne
WSFM 101.7 Sydney
Gold 80s
WSFM 80s
CADA

New Zealand
 Warner Bros. Discovery New Zealand
 Three
 ThreePlus1
 Bravo
 Bravo Plus 1
 Rush
 Eden
 HGTV
 TLC
 Living
 Investigation Discovery
 Discovery
 Discovery Turbo
 Animal Planet
 Cartoon Network
 CNN International
 MediaWorks New Zealand
 George FM
 Mai FM
 Magic
 More FM
 The Breeze
 The Edge
 The Rock
 The Sound
 Today FM
 Wandr
 New Zealand Media and Entertainment
 New Zealand Herald
 Weekend Herald
 Herald on Sunday
 The Northern Advocate
 Rotorua Daily Post
 Bay of Plenty Times
 Hawke's Bay Today
 Whanganui Chronicle
 Wairarapa Times-Age
 Hamilton News
 Taupo and Turangi Weekender
 Bay News
 Whangamata Coastal News
 Katikati Advertiser
 Waihi Leader
 Whakatane News
 Central Hawke's Bay Mail
 Havelock North Village Press
 Horowhenua Chronicle
 Kapiti News
 Manawatu Guardian
 Wairarapa Midweek
 Coast
 Flava
 Hokonui
 Mix
 Radio Hauraki
 The Hits
 ZM
 ZM Whangarei
 ZM Auckland
 ZM Waikato
 ZM Wellington
 ZM Christchurch
 Newstalk ZB
 Radio Sport
 nzherald.co.nz
 GrabOne
 Driven
 YUDU
 Sky
 Prime
 Sky 5
 Sky Box Sets
 Sky Arts
 Sky Movies Premiere
 Sky Movies Comedy
 Sky Movies Action
 Sky Movies Greats
 Sky Movies Classics
 Sky Movies Collection
 Sky Movies Family
 Sky Sport Select
 Sky Sport 1
 Sky Sport 2
 Sky Sport 3
 Sky Sport 4
 Sky Sport 5
 Sky Sport 6
 Sky Sport 7 beIN Sports
 Sky Sport 8
 Sky Sport 9
 Sky Sport Pop-Up
 Sky Box Office
 Sky Arena
 Sky Digital Music

See also
Broadcast clock
Broadcast network
Citizen media
Digital broadcasting
Leonard Plugge

References

External links
 Video (audio) interview with Ray Fitzwalter on commercial TV in Britain, The rise and fall of ITV, Frontline Club, London, May 2008.

Broadcasting